Karilyn Bonilla Colón is a Puerto Rican politician and the current mayor of Salinas. Bonilla is affiliated with the Popular Democratic Party (PPD) and has served as mayor since 2013.

References

Living people
Democratic Party (Puerto Rico) politicians
Mayors of places in Puerto Rico
Popular Democratic Party (Puerto Rico) politicians
People from Salinas, Puerto Rico
21st-century Puerto Rican women politicians
21st-century Puerto Rican politicians
Women mayors of places in Puerto Rico
1979 births